Ericydeus nigropunctatus is a species of the true weevil family.

Description
This beetle is glossy, light green, with black spots.

Distribution
This species occurs in Colombia, Ecuador, Peru, and Venezuela.

References

Entiminae
Beetles described in 1877